Orie Leon Phillips (November 20, 1885 – November 14, 1974) was a United States circuit judge of the United States Court of Appeals for the Tenth Circuit and previously was a United States district judge of the United States District Court for the District of New Mexico.

Education and career

Born on November 20, 1885, in Mercer County, Illinois, Phillips received a Juris Doctor in 1908 from the University of Michigan Law School. He entered private practice in Raton, New Mexico Territory (State of New Mexico from January 6, 1912) from 1910 to 1923. He was an assistant district attorney in the Eighth Judicial District of New Mexico from 1912 to 1916. He was general attorney of the St. Louis, Rocky Mountain and Pacific Company from 1917 to 1923. He was a member of the New Mexico Senate from 1920 to 1923.

Federal judicial service

Phillips was nominated by President Warren G. Harding on February 28, 1923, to the United States District Court for the District of New Mexico, to a new seat authorized by 42 Stat. 837. He was confirmed by the United States Senate on March 3, 1923, and received his commission the same day. His service terminated on April 29, 1929, due to his elevation to the Tenth Circuit.

Phillips was nominated by President Herbert Hoover on April 18, 1929, to the United States Court of Appeals for the Tenth Circuit, to a new seat authorized by 45 Stat. 1346. He was confirmed by the Senate on April 29, 1929, and received his commission the same day. He was a member of the Conference of Senior Circuit Judges (now the Judicial Conference of the United States) from 1940 to 1948, and a member of the Judicial Conference of the United States from 1948 to 1955. He served as Chief Judge from 1948 to 1956. He assumed senior status on January 1, 1956. His service terminated on November 14, 1974, due to his death.

Supreme Court consideration
Orie Phillips was considered several times for the Supreme Court without ever being nominated. He had been considered a possibility to replace Oliver Wendell Holmes, Jr. as Associate Justice when the latter stepped down in 1932, but the choice ultimately went to Benjamin N. Cardozo. Following the death of Harlan Fiske Stone in 1946, Phillips was on Harry S. Truman’s short list to replace him as Chief Justice, but the job ultimately went to Fred Vinson. In 1953 Phillips was considered one of the final six prospects to replace Vinson as Chief Justice but was not chosen due to his age at the time.

See also
 List of United States federal judges by longevity of service

References

Sources
 

1885 births
1974 deaths
New Mexico state senators
Judges of the United States District Court for the District of New Mexico
United States district court judges appointed by Warren G. Harding
Judges of the United States Court of Appeals for the Tenth Circuit
United States court of appeals judges appointed by Herbert Hoover
20th-century American judges
University of Michigan Law School alumni
People from Mercer County, Illinois